Goncharovka is a rural locality (a village) and the administrative centre of Goncharovsky Selsoviet, Fyodorovsky District, Bashkortostan, Russia. The population was 1,020 as of 2010. There are 11 streets.

Geography 
Goncharovka is located 7 km southwest of Fyodorovka (the district's administrative centre) by road. Fyodorovka is the nearest rural locality.

References 

Rural localities in Fyodorovsky District